Sandra Parpan (born 7 November 1967) is a Swiss cross-country skier who competed from 1988 to 2007. She finished fourth in the 4 × 5 km relay at the 1988 Winter Olympics in Calgary.

Parpan later competed in the FIS Marathon Cup, earning her best finish of 28th in Switzerland in 2007.

Cross-country skiing results
All results are sourced from the International Ski Federation (FIS).

Olympic Games

World Championships

World Cup

Season standings

References

External links
 
 
 
 Women's 4 x 5 km cross-country relay Olympic results: 1976-2002 

1967 births
Cross-country skiers at the 1988 Winter Olympics
Living people
Swiss female cross-country skiers
20th-century Swiss women